Orfei is Italian surname:

 Giovanni Orfei (born 1976, Tivoli), Italian footballer
 Liana Orfei (born 1937), Italian film actress
 Orfeo Orfei (1836-1915), Italian painter
 Moira Orfei (aka: Miranda Orfei; born 1931, Codroipo), Italian actress and television personality

See also
 Orfey (disambiguation)

Italian-language surnames
Italian families